Illinois Route 53 (IL 53) is an arterial north–south state highway in northeast Illinois. It mainly cuts through the western suburbs of Chicago, passes through Bolingbrook, Romeoville, Crest Hill and Joliet, merging into I-55 at Gardner.

Route description 

IL 53 begins at the County Road 29 (CR 29) and I-55 interchange and heads east in Gardner. At the first intersection, the route runs along the path of historic US 66 for about  before making a left and leaving former US 66. The route continues east and loops around Gardner before heading northeast, running parallel with I-55. It crosses over the Mazon River before passing through Braceville and Godley. In Braidwood, the highway intersects IL 113 and runs parallel with IL 129. IL 129 moves away from IL 53 before entering the Hitts Siding Prairie Nature Preserve. IL 53 the crosses over the Kankakee River before intersecting the northern terminus of IL 102 in Wilmington. The route then continues north through the Midewin National Tallgrass Prairie, passing by the Abraham Lincoln National Cemetery and the former Joliet Arsenal in Elwood. From Elwood to Joliet, the route follows the old alignment of US 66, becoming concurrent with US 52 for nearly a mile. It also intersects I-80 before separating from US 52 and running concurrently with US 6 entering downtown. At the intersection of US 30, IL 53 separates from US 6 and continues north. It crosses over the Des Plaines River before running concurrently with IL 7 and passing by the Stateville Correctional Center in Crest Hill.

Near Lewis University, IL 7 separates from IL 53. The route passes by Romeoville before interchanging I-55 in Bolingbrook. IL Lisle, the route interchanges US 34 before meeting I-88. It then intersects IL 56 and IL 38 before passing under and running parallel with I-355. West of Addison, it intersects US 20 before passing under I-355 again. Then, it runs parallel with I-290 and intersects IL 19. At Biesterfield Road, the highway then runs concurrently with I-290, intersecting IL 72 and passing over IL 58 before reaching the northern terminus of I-290 at I-90. From there, IL 53 remains as a freeway heading north. It interchanges IL 62, US 14, and US 12 in Palatine. The northeast Palatine stretch that goes through the Rand (US 12) and Dundee (IL 68) interchanges is considered to be one of the country's deadliest interchanges in traffic accidents. It then heads north at the intersection of North Hicks Road. It then heads east through Long Grove and reaches its northern terminus at IL 83.

History 
SBI Route 53 ran from Romeoville to Long Grove on Rohlwing Road and Hicks Road from 1924 to 1963. From 1963 through 1970, it was routed onto a new freeway from Addison to Rolling Meadows and cosigned with I-90 until that was changed to I-290.

In 1967 IL 53 was extended to Gardner, and in 1995 IL 129 was routed onto IL 53 south of Braidwood. This lasted a year until IL 129 was dropped entirely south of Braidwood. Near the northern end, the freeway was extended from Dundee Road to Lake–Cook Road in 1989. In 1990, with the construction of I-355, IL 53 was moved off the I-290/I-355 combination south of Biesterfield Road and back onto its original alignment.

For over 40 years, IL 53 had been at the center of a major dispute regarding a northern extension of its freeway segment into Lake County. The studied corridor ran from the current terminus of the freeway at Lake–Cook Road north to a planned bypass for IL 120 near Grayslake, as part of an earlier plan to build a freeway from Chicago to Madison, Wisconsin. The combined IL 53/IL 120 extension would have formed a large T-shape in the center of Lake County, with the IL 120 bypass carrying through traffic from US 12 to the Tri-State Tollway around Gurnee. The extension was opposed by several organizations, notably the Illinois chapter of the Sierra Club, and many residents of Long Grove, which lies in the path of the highway. The Sierra Club opposed the roadway extension because it would have been routed through wetlands and the group had concerns about suburban sprawl and increased pollution. Due to funding constraints with IDOT, the Illinois General Assembly authorized the Illinois Tollway to plan and construct the IL 53 extension in 1993, and was studied on and off for 25 years. In 2019, the latest study was suspended, effectively cancelling the project.

Major intersections

References

External links 

 IL Route 53 Traffic and Road Conditions
 Illinois Route 53 Study at IDOT
 Illinois Route 53/120 Project Archives (Illinois Tollway)
 Illinois Route 53 Land Expansion Alternative Use Task Force (Illinois Department of Natural Resources)

State highways in Illinois
U.S. Route 66 in Illinois
53
Illinois Route 53
Illinois Route 53
Illinois Route 53
Illinois Route 53
Illinois Route 53